Mayowa Oluyeba is a Nigerian Filmmaker, Broadcast Technology Consultant, and Director.

Early life and education 
Mayowa Oluyeba was born in Lagos State, Nigeria. He attended Saint Agnes Primary School, Maryland, Lagos and Maryland Comprehensive High School, Maryland, Lagos, Nigeria.
He studied Banking and Finance at Kwara State Polytechnic, Kwara State, Nigeria, and obtained an online certification in People Analytics,  from the University of Pennsylvania, Philadelphia, USA. Customer Analytics, University of Pennsylvania, Operation Analytics, University of Pennsylvania

Career 
Oluyeba's career in the creative industry started when he incidentally met the late Film Producer/Director, Amaka Igwe.

He thereafter joined Solar Productions owned by Gboyega Adelaja, with Olumide Ofere and Remi Ogunpitan as directors in the company. There he gained exposure to TV and Film Production.

In 1997, he partnered with his friend Remi Kehinde, to start Mega Visions - A Special Effects Company for home videos. They produced Special Effects for various movies including 'Haunted' and the movie, 'Oshodi Oke' (featuring actress Ronke Ojo).
He joined Reuters News Agency in the year 2000. He worked as a news stringer and he covered breaking news stories across Nigeria, shot footages for Africa Journal and transmitted news via live wire. Oluyeba reported stories for Reuters during the late Moshood Abiola political era, the Yoruba/Hausa fights, and many others'.

Oluyeba joined Bi-Communications as an Editor, and worked on the Nigerian Police sponsored series 'Crime Fighters - the Police & You', which was a re-enactment of the Nigerian Police narrative, where he worked with Director/Producer, Tade Ogidan. "Crime Fighters – The Police and You"

Personal work 
Mayowa Oluyeba started Phoenix Visions Limited – a company that offers consultancy services in Broadcast Studio Configuration and Installations, Live Streaming - Installations and Operations, Equipment Purchase, and General Broadcast Engineering and maintenance. 

Oluyeba has also worked on various productions which include;
 Moments with Mo
 DV Worx Studios
 Gidi Blues
 The Room – Nkoyo 
 Shell Short Film Documentaries
 Sex Abuse (Short Film - ProjectTen4)
 Healing Streams of God Choir Yearly Carols

In September 2016, Mayowa Oluyeba was signed by Zuri24 Media to be the Series Producer for 'Battleground' (M-Net Commissioned Daily Telenovela 2017).

See also
 List of Nigerian film producers

References

Nigerian film directors
Nigerian film producers
Year of birth missing (living people)
Living people
Nigerian editors
University of Pennsylvania alumni